Raina MacIntyre is the Professor of Global Biosecurity within the Kirby Institute at University of New South Wales and a National Health and Medical Research Council Principal Research Fellow, who leads a research program on the prevention and control of infectious diseases. She is an expert media advisor and commentator on Australia's response to COVID-19.

Early life and education 
Born in Colombo in 1964, MacIntyre moved to Australia in 1973. She was educated at Sydney Girls' High School, before studying medicine at the University of Sydney. She was among the first graduates of the Master of Applied Epidemiology program established at the Australian National University by American epidemiologist Michael Lane, to whom she credits her interest in infectious disease epidemiology.

Career 
MacIntyre's work is focused on emerging infections, encompassing vaccines, personal protective equipment, aerosol dynamics, respiratory pathogen transmission, and the detection and prevention of bioterrorism. Other research interests include medical ethics and the prevention of disease in older people. Macintyre has more than 380 peer-reviewed publications, and contributes to expert committees and editorial boards.

After completing her PhD under Aileen Plant, MacIntyre was awarded a Harkness Fellowship to Johns Hopkins University.

In Australia, MacIntyre became "a familiar face on television and radio" during the Covid-19 pandemic, her epidemiological commentary "calmly delivered from her bedroom, where she continues her research almost around the clock".

Media 
MacIntyre has been a regular commentator and contributor to Covid epidemiology, in The Guardian, The Sydney Morning Herald, as well as ABC News and Q+A. In a lunch interview with The Sydney Morning Herald she was described as a 'globally renowned" and "the cautious coronavirus communicator".

MacIntyre has been interviewed extensively for her expertise during the pandemic in Australia, including an interview on booster jabs, by Norman Swan from the ABC, and about vaccination roll-outs across different states. She is recognised as one of the "most recognisable faces whom the Australian media has designated an expert during COVID-19". Her modelling, from the Kirby Institute, has been used to determine whether states will re-open or not.

MacIntyre's portrait was painted for the 2021 Archibald Prize by artist Karen Black. Due to the frequent media appearances, she caught Black's fancy and the artist "set her heart on painting the professor for the Archibald Prize". "How she explained the scientific facts around aspects of the virus was easy to comprehend," Karen Black commented.

Books

Prizes and awards 
 2022 - Winner, Department of Defence Eureka Prize for Leadership in Science and Innovation.
 2017 - CAPHIA Research Team Prize.
 2016 - Fellow of The NSW Royal Society.
 2014 - Peter Baume Public Health Impact Prize.
 2014 - Public Health Association of Australia, National Immunisation Achievement Award.
 2007 - Sir Henry Wellcome Medal and Prize from the Association of Military Surgeons of the US for her work on bioterrorism.
 2003 - Frank Fenner Prize

Selected publications

References

External links 

 Stick to your guns – Women's Agenda interview by Madeline Hislop, 15 Jul 2021
Vaccines, variants and the post-COVID future – episode in Kirby Seminar Series, 20 May 2021

Australian women academics
Australian women scientists
Living people
Women epidemiologists
People educated at Sydney Girls High School
University of Sydney alumni
Australian National University alumni
Fellows of the Royal Australasian College of Physicians
1964 births